Group B of the 1996 Fed Cup Europe/Africa Zone Group I was one of four pools in the Europe/Africa Zone Group I of the 1996 Fed Cup. Four teams competed in a round robin competition, with the top two teams advancing to the knockout stage and the bottom team being relegated down to Group II for 1996.

Italy vs. Latvia

Sweden vs. Norway

Italy vs. Sweden

Latvia vs. Norway

Italy vs. Norway

Sweden vs. Latvia

  placed last in the pool, and thus was relegated to Group II in 1997, where they placed fourth in their pool of six.

See also
Fed Cup structure

References

External links
 Fed Cup website

1996 Fed Cup Europe/Africa Zone